Herberton "Rusty" Fricke (born September 1, 1964) is a former American football placekicker who played five seasons in the Arena Football League with the Pittsburgh Gladiators, Denver Dynamite and Cincinnati Rockers. Fricke played college football at Lycoming College. He was AFL Kicker of the Year and First Team All-Arena in 1991. He was named to the AFL 10th Anniversary Team in 1996.

References

External links
Just Sports Stats
Lycoming Warriors bio

Living people
1964 births
Players of American football from Pennsylvania
American football placekickers
Lycoming Warriors football players
Pittsburgh Gladiators players
Denver Dynamite (arena football) players
Cincinnati Rockers players
People from Montgomery County, Pennsylvania